SMS games may refer to:

 Super Mario Sunshine, 2002 video game
 List of Master System games, for Sega Master System games
 Short Messaging System games, see text messaging

See also
 SMS (disambiguation)